Pseudodreata aroa is a moth of the Anthelidae family. It was described by George Thomas Bethune-Baker in 1904. It is found in New Guinea.

References

Moths described in 1904
Anthelidae